Manfred: Dramatic Poem with Music in Three Parts (Opus 115) [German: Manfred. Dramatisches Gedicht in drei Abtheilungen] is a work of incidental music by Robert Schumann. The work is based on the 1817 poem Manfred by Lord Byron and consists of an overture, an entracte, melodramas, and several solos and choruses.

Written primarily in 1848, it was first performed at the Gewandhaus concert at Leipzig on 14 March 1852. The most highly regarded piece in the work is the Overture. Composer Hugo Wolf wrote that the work "has brought the essence, the focal point of the drama to plastic expression with the simplest strokes." Music historian Peter Ostwald wrote that the Overture was written during a time when Schumann was facing "exquisite suffering" from "inner voices," or auditory hallucinations.

See also
List of compositions by Robert Schumann

References

External links
Manfred, Op.115 (Schumann, Robert) via IMSLP

Compositions by Robert Schumann
1848 compositions
Musical settings of poems by Lord Byron